Cyrus Walker Alexander III (born September 9, 1953) is an American former college basketball head coach who's currently an assistant head coach at Alcorn State and most recently held a head coaching position at North Carolina A&T University, having resigned on January 29, 2016 after 22 games into the 2015–16 season. He was also a longtime men's basketball coach at South Carolina State University. In April 2003, after 16 seasons at SCSU, Alexander moved to coach Tennessee State University. Alexander was fired as coach of TSU in February 2009. He was born in Winston-Salem, North Carolina.

On April 21, 2012, Alexander was hired as head coach of NC A&T. He resigned in January 2016 to pursue other opportunities within the North Carolina A&T athletics department. On August 9, 2022, he was named an assistant coach at Alcorn State.

Head coaching record

* resigned on 1/29/16

References

External links
 North Carolina A&T profile
 Tennessee State profile

1953 births
Living people
Basketball coaches from North Carolina
College men's basketball head coaches in the United States
Howard Bison men's basketball coaches
North Carolina A&T Aggies men's basketball coaches
South Carolina State Bulldogs basketball coaches
Sportspeople from Winston-Salem, North Carolina
Tennessee State Tigers basketball coaches